D-line is a major business and urban residential area of Port Harcourt, Rivers State. Its geographical coordinates are 4°48'8" North, 7°0'10" East. The neighborhood is sometimes spelled "D/Line" and has a zipcode of 500261.

The Roman Catholic Diocese of Port Harcourt and the Methodist Church of Nigeria have their cathedrals situated in D-line.

Geography
D-line is located approximately 5 km (3 miles) away from the Port Harcourt NAF Base, and approximately 8 km (5 miles) south-west of Elelenwo.

Nearby places

Education

Schools
There are elementary and secondary schools operating within the D-line boundaries:

 Government Girls Secondary School, Oromineke.
 Methodist Comprehensive High School
 Niger Grammar School

Organizations
Organizations in D-Line, range from law firms, NGO's to Boutique and a Tech Hub.

Tech Hub
 Olotu Square Solutions - No 1 Khana Street D-Line Port Harcourt, Rivers State

Notable residents (past and present)
Agbani Darego (born 1982), model, best known as the first black African Miss World.

References

 
D-line
Neighbourhoods in Port Harcourt